Sovinj-e Sofla (also Romanized as Sovīnj-e Soflá; also known as Sovīch-e Pā'īn) is a village in Barvanan-e Gharbi Rural District, Torkamanchay District, Meyaneh County, East Azerbaijan Province, Iran. At the 2006 census, its population was 331, in 72 families.

References 

Populated places in Meyaneh County